Timothy "Tim" Doner (born 25 October 1995) is an American hyperpolyglot, former social media personality and a foreign policy analyst at the Washington-based Center for Advanced Defense Studies, specializing in the Middle East and Central Asia. A graduate of Harvard University and the University of Cambridge, he rose to prominence at the age of 17 when he released a YouTube video in 2013 in which he spoke 20 different languages. He is a native of Manhattan, New York City and resident of the East Village.

Early life and education 
Timothy Doner was born to Betsy and Ezra Doner on October 25, 1995 in Manhattan, New York City, United States. Tim's prelude to learning languages apparently began at the age of 13 when he started teaching himself Hebrew out of interest in 2009 after memorizing the lyrics of his favorite funk band Hadag Nahash. He then moved to Arabic and other languages, like Persian, Pashto, Hindi, Indonesian, Wolof, Hausa, Swahili, IsiXhosa, Ojibwe, Dutch, Italian, Japanese, etc. Doner studied at the Dalton School.

Languages 
The languages that Doner has publicly displayed that he can speak, fluently or not, are these, in no particular order.

Personal life 
During a short interview on the Australian breakfast show program Sunrise, Doner revealed that Persian is one of his favorite languages and is fond of reading the works of 14th-century Iranian poet Hafez-e-Shirazi.

References

American Jews
People from the East Village, Manhattan
Living people
Harvard University alumni
Dalton School alumni
1995 births